The Temiya Line (手宮線, Temiya-sen) was a local freight narrow gauge railroad in Otaru, Hokkaidō, Japan, connecting Minami-Otaru Station and Temiya Station. The line was a state-owned enterprise, originally established in the late 19th century to transport coal and marine products, and closed in 1985.

The line was originally constructed as a part of the Horonai Railway, the first railway in Hokkaidō, and began operations in 1880. Like many other Meiji period railroad enterprises, the line uses  gauge track over its 2.8 km route, in order to lower the cost of the original project. Though it was originally intended to extend from the seashore to the colliery at Temari-mura Kayanuma, this was deemed inefficient, as ships could do the same work. The Horonai Railway was sold to the Hokkaidō Colliery and Railway Company in 1889, and by 1906 the Temiya Line had come under government control, officially inaugurated under that name three years later. It carried both cargo and passengers, for nearly a century. Elements of service in the area, on the Temiya Line and other related lines, were discontinued in 1962, and the line formally closed in 1985.

For the majority of its time in service, the line only stopped at Temiya and Minami-Otaru Stations, where it connected with the Hakodate Main Line.

Today, parts of the line still remain, along with signage in some places. The local Otaru Memorial Museum is caretaker of the remains, and proposals to revive the line have been discussed.

References
This article's contents are derived from those on the corresponding article on the Japanese Wikipedia.

Railway lines in Japan
1985 disestablishments in Japan
Railway lines opened in 1880
1067 mm gauge railways in Japan